This is a list of Monuments of National Importance (ASI) as officially recognized by and available through the website of the Archaeological Survey of India in the Indian state Haryana. The monument identifier is a combination of the abbreviation of the subdivision of the list (state, ASI circle) and the numbering as published on the website of the ASI. 90 Monuments of National Importance have been recognized by the ASI in Haryana.

List of monuments of national importance 

|}

See also

 State Protected Monuments in Haryana
 List of Indus Valley Civilization sites in Haryana, Punjab, Rajasthan, Gujarat, India & Pakistan
 National Parks & Wildlife Sanctuaries of Haryana
 List of Indian states and territories by highest point 
 Haryana Tourism

References 

Haryana
 
Monuments of National Importance